Huddersfield West was a parliamentary constituency centred on the town of Huddersfield in West Yorkshire.  It returned one Member of Parliament (MP)  to the House of Commons of the Parliament of the United Kingdom.

The constituency was created for the 1950 general election, and abolished for the 1983 general election.

It was a much more marginal seat than its neighbour, Huddersfield East, which was safely Labour, and was alternately held by the Liberals, Labour Party and finally the Conservatives in 1979.

Boundaries
The County Borough of Huddersfield wards of Birkby, Crosland Moor, Lindley, Lockwood, Longwood, Marsh, Milnsbridge, and Paddock.

Members of Parliament

When this seat was abolished in 1983, Dickens was elected MP for the new seat of Littleborough and Saddleworth, which he held until he died in 1995. Most of the area which this seat covered is now held by Labour within the Huddersfield constituency however its western outskirts now fall under Colne Valley which is a marginal Conservative seat.

Elections

Elections in the 1950s

Elections in the 1960s

Elections in the 1970s

References 

Election results, 1950 - 1979

Parliamentary constituencies in Yorkshire and the Humber (historic)
Politics of Huddersfield
Constituencies of the Parliament of the United Kingdom established in 1950
Constituencies of the Parliament of the United Kingdom disestablished in 1983